Saturnine Martial & Lunatic is a compilation album by the British pop rock band Tears for Fears, released on 3 June 1996. It is a collection of B-sides and rare tracks, spanning some ten years of recording from the band's era signed to Mercury/Phonogram. The album also includes their 1983 hit single "The Way You Are".

The album includes liner notes written by the band members themselves, reflecting on the tracks included.

Track listing
"Johnny Panic and the Bible of Dreams (Fluke Remix)" – 6:21
"The Big Chair" – 3:20
"Schrödinger's Cat" – 5:03
"My Life in the Suicide Ranks" – 4:32
"When in Love With a Blind Man" – 2:24
"Pharaohs (Single Version)" – 3:41
"Déjà-Vu and the Sins of Science" – 6:24
"The Marauders" – 4:08
"Tears Roll Down" – 3:16
"New Star" – 4:26
"The Body Wah" – 5:19
"Lord of Karma" – 4:41
"Bloodletting Go" – 4:11
"Always in the Past" – 4:38
"Sea Song" – 3:51
"Ashes to Ashes" – 4:31
"Empire Building" – 2:49
"The Way You Are" – 4:57

Notes
Track 1 written by Orzabal.
Tracks 2 and 6 written by Orzabal/Smith/Stanley/Hughes.
Tracks 3, 7, 10, 11, 12, and 13 written by Orzabal/Griffiths.
Track 4 written by Orzabal/Stanley/Hughes.
Tracks 5, 8, and 14 written by Orzabal/Stanley.
Track 9 written by Orzabal/Bascombe.
Track 17 written by Orzabal/Smith/Stanley.
Track 18 written by Orzabal/Smith/Stanley/Elias.
Track 15 written by Robert Wyatt.
Track 16 written by David Bowie.

Publishing Years
Track 1 Ⓟ 1991 Mercury Records Ltd. (London)
Tracks 2, 5, 17 Ⓟ 1984 Mercury Records Ltd. (London)
Tracks 3, 7, 10, 13 Ⓟ 1993 Mercury Records Ltd. (London)
Tracks 4, 9, 14 Ⓟ 1989 Mercury Records Ltd. (London)
Tracks 6, 15 Ⓟ 1985 Mercury Records Ltd. (London)
Tracks 8, 18 Ⓟ 1983 Mercury Records Ltd. (London)
Track 11 Ⓟ 1996 Mercury Records Ltd. (London)
Tracks 12, 16 Ⓟ 1992 Mercury Records Ltd. (London)

Notes
The included version of "Johnny Panic" is not the original 1990, B-side version, but the remix produced by Fluke, which was released in 1991 as a single in its own right. The original can be heard on the B-side of "Advice for the Young at Heart" and also on the remastered CD of The Seeds of Love.
The included version of "Tears Roll Down" is the original B-side from 1989, not the later "Laid So Low (Tears Roll Down)" version which was a hit single in 1992.
Although this album was released after Raoul and the Kings of Spain, it contains none of the various B-sides recorded around the time of that album as Tears for Fears had switched record labels by that time.
"Ashes to Ashes" is from the NME charity album Ruby Trax.
This album came out before the remastered TFF albums which had many of the B-sides added. It is unclear if the tracks on Saturnine are remastered or not.

References

B-side compilation albums
Tears for Fears albums
1996 compilation albums
Mercury Records compilation albums
Fontana Records compilation albums